Spells Writing Lab, Inc. (formerly Spells Writing Center, Inc.) aka (“Spells”) is a Philadelphia, Pennsylvania, US-based 501(c)(3) non-profit organization that develops the creative and expository writing abilities of school-age children, 6 to 18 years old, through writing programs and teacher development. Spells was inspired by the model established by 826 National an organization started by educator Nínive Calegari and Dave Eggers, author of "A Heartbreaking Work of Staggering Genius," and founder of the publishing house, McSweeney's. Philly Spells is currently applying to join the 826 National network through the 826 National Chapter Development Process.

Spells offers the following programs:

After-school drop-in tutoring;
Weekend writing workshops;
6 week writing intensive summer camp;
Spring break writing camp;
In-school assistance with student publications;
Partnerships with non-profits;
Professional development for teachers;
School field trips (pending).

History
Spells was founded in January 2009 by Jill Schiller with the support of Christina Rose Dubb, Josh Freely, Caroline Tiger, Jared Von Arx, Jennifer McCreary and Steven Wittenberg, was officially recognized as a charitable organization by the Commonwealth of Pennsylvania on April 29, 2009 and received its 501(c)(3) status on February 4, 2010. Spells is currently located on the campus of the Village of Arts and Humanities in North Philadelphia. Writing workshops began in June, 2009, writing intensive summer camp, established June, 2010 and after school tutoring established February, 2011. To date Spells has conducted over 70 individual programs.

Spells has partnered on writing initiatives with organizations such as the Mayor’s PhillyGoes2College project, Painted Bride Art Center, Fairmount Art Center, Mural Arts Project and local bookstores to provide free programming throughout Philadelphia. 
 
Notable moments in Spells history include the Simpsons Workshop, a cartoon program with Matt Selman, Emmy Award-winning Writer/Exec Producer for The Simpsons, the unique Zombie Talent Show fundraiser and Huffington Post feature calling Spells “A Writing Gem in North Philadelphia.”

Spells is currently participating in the 826 National Chapter Development Process. 826 National has commended Spells on their progress as they continue along the trajectory toward their goal of becoming an 826 Chapter.

Volunteer Network
Spells is supported by a network of volunteers which includes authors, journalists, poets, teachers, documentary filmmakers, attorneys, PHDs and MBAs.  The volunteer staff as of October, 2012 includes, Christina Rose Dubb, Executive Director and Elizabeth Encarnacion, Programming Director.

Spells has attracted support in the form of sponsors, Board of Directors and Advisory Board support from local literary and cultural superstars such as New York Times bestselling authors Elizabeth Gilbert (Eat, Pray, Love), Lisa Scottoline, Jennifer Weiner (In Her Shoes) and Buzz Bissinger (Friday Night Lights: A Town, a Team, and a Dream). Additional support comes from other notable public figures such as Tigre Hill (filmmaker), Christina Pirello (author and TV personality), Carol Saline (author), Lori L. Tharps (author), Diana Rodriquez Wallach (author), and Seth Williams (District Attorney). 
Spells provides college level internship/co-op programs through Ursinus College, Drexel University, Haverford College, Temple University and urban public high school students. These internships provide apprenticeship-style opportunities with local literary professionals through personalized interactions and mentorship.

Spells Writing Lab board of directors as of October 2012
Perri Shaw Borish, MSS, LCSW;
Erin Cambeiro, Writer/Educator;
Jonathan C. Dunsmoor, Esq.;
Christina Rose Dubb, Ed. D.;
Cara Levinson, MBA, Secretary;
Zachary Pappis;
Denise Saugling;
Roxanne Patel Shepelavy, Writer;
Erec Smith, Ph.D.;
Emil Steiner;
Adam Twersky, MBA;
Steven Wittenberg, JD, MBA, LLM, President, Treasurer

Advisory board as of October 2012
Joshua Freely, Ph.D.;
Stephen Fried;
Elizabeth Gilbert;
Tigre Hill, Film-maker;
Jenn McCreary;
Carol Saline;
Jill Schiller, Esq.;
Lisa Scottoline;
Lori L. Tharps;
Caroline Tiger;
Jared Von Arx, Ph.D.;
Diana Rodriguez Wallach

References

1.   ^ "Creative Writing Centers Help Students Become Published Authors". U.S. News & World Report. https://www.usnews.com/education/blogs/high-school-notes/2011/09/23/creative-writing-centers-help-students-become-published-authors.

2.	^ "Writing Program Supplements US Public Education". Voice of America. http://www.voanews.com/english/news/usa/Writing-Program-Supplements-US-Public-Education-134436248.html.

3.	^ "About". 826 National. http://www.826national.org/about.

4.	^ "How Dave Eggers Is Making Learning Fun". Inc. Magazine. http://www.inc.com/magazine/20110501/social-entrepreneurs-how-dave-eggers-is-making-learning-fun.html.

5.	http://www.elizabethencarnacion.com/category/spells/

6.	http://www.jenniferweiner.com/

7.	http://roxanneshepelavy.com/

8.	http://www.dianarodriguezwallach.com/

9.	http://www.carolinetiger.com/

10.	http://www.perrishawborish.com/

11.	http://roxanneshepelavy.com/

12.	http://www.stephenfried.com/

13.	http://www.elizabethgilbert.com/

14.	http://www.huffingtonpost.com/peak-johnson/a-writing-gem-in-north-ph_b_1590302.html

15.	http://www.foxbookshop.com/event/spells-writing-lab-lisa-scottoline-save-me

16.	http://www.foxbookshop.com/event/spells-writing-center-elizabeth-gilbert-and-catherine-gilbert-murdock

17.	http://www.phillyfunguide.com/event/detail/440799267/Quizzo_for_Cheaters_Benefit_for_Spells_Writing_Lab

18.	http://villagearts.org/community

19.	http://www.philaculture.org/image/6002

20.	http://calendar.phillymag.com/philadelphia_pa/events/show/252142924-spies-like-us-writing-workshops

21.	http://www.gse.upenn.edu/features/urban/spells

22.	http://www.prlog.org/10520108-spells-writing-center-celebrates-community-open-house-with-new-name-logo.html

23.	http://likeminded.org/project/spells-writing-lab-creative-writing-for-the-community

24.	http://www.generocity.org/news/421

25.	http://aigaphilly.org/events/2012/my-philly-call-student-volunteers

26.	http://www.philly.com/philly/blogs/entertainment/celebrities_gossip/148277256.html

27.	http://beth-kephart.blogspot.com/2012/04/see-buzz-bissinger-talk-about.html

28.	http://www.hotlist.com/event/217440495029505/Being-Buzz-Bissinger-Fundraiser-to-Support-Spells-Writing-Lab

29.	http://www.paigewolf.com/newsletters/2012-04.html

30.	http://germantownavenueparents.com/2009/06/philly-spells-writing-center-presents-write-your-own-fairy-tale/

31.	http://www.phillyfunguide.com/event/detail/49549/The_Zombie_Talent_Show_Fundraiser

Educational organizations based in the United States